Rho Tauri (ρ Tau, ρ Tauri) is a star in the constellation Taurus and a member of the Hyades star cluster.

Rho Tauri is a white A-type main sequence dwarf with a mean apparent magnitude of +4.66. It is approximately 158 light years from Earth. Classified as a Delta Scuti type variable star, its brightness varies by 0.010 magnitudes over a period of 1.61 hours.

It has 1.88 times the mass of the Sun, with a projected rotational velocity of 117 km/s and an estimated rotation period of 488.5 days.

References

Tauri, Rho
Taurus (constellation)
Delta Scuti variables
A-type main-sequence stars
Hyades (star cluster)
1444
021273
028910
BD+14 0720
Tauri, 086